Armando Enrique Cooper Whitaker (born 26 November 1987) is a Panamanian professional footballer who plays as a midfielder for Israeli club Maccabi Petah Tikva and the Panama national team.

Club career
Cooper began his career in the youth ranks of Panama's Árabe Unido. In 2006, he debuted for the professional side, and went on to help the team to achieve various domestic titles in the Liga Panameña de Fútbol. During January 2011 it was reported that Major League Soccer side New York Red Bulls were interested in signing Cooper. However, the transfer did not go through.

In July 2011, he signed with Godoy Cruz of the Argentine First Division.

In February 2015, Cooper joined 2. Bundesliga side FC St. Pauli, only to return to Árabe Unido in September 2015 after playing a mere 125 minutes for the German club.

Cooper was loaned to Major League Soccer side Toronto FC on 18 August 2016. He scored his first goal with Toronto FC on 30 November as Toronto FC beat Montreal Impact 7–5 on aggregate to advance to the 2016 MLS Cup Final.

After the 2016 MLS Cup Playoffs, Cooper signed full-time with Toronto FC.

On 14 December 2017, Cooper's contract option was declined by Toronto, and he subsequently left the club.

International career
Cooper was part of the Panama U-20 squad that participated in the 2007 U-20 World Cup held in Canada.

He made his debut with the full national team on 7 October 2006 against the national team of El Salvador. On 16 January 2011, he scored his first goal for Panama in a 2–0 victory over Nicaragua in a 2011 Copa Centroamericana match played at Estadio Rommel Fernández in Panama City.

In May 2018, he was named in Panama's preliminary 35 man squad for the 2018 World Cup in Russia. Cooper played in Panama's first two games against England and Belgium, but after receiving yellow cards in both games he was suspended for the final match against Tunisia.

Style of play
Cooper is known for his energy on the pitch, as well as his creativity and dribbling skills. A versatile midfielder, he is capable of playing in several midfield positions, although he usually favours a more offensive role.

Career statistics

Scores and results list Panama's goal tally first, score column indicates score after each Cooper goal.

Honours
Toronto FC
MLS Cup: 2017; runner-up 2016
Eastern Conference Championship (Playoffs): 2016, 2017
Supporters' Shield: 2017
Canadian Championship: 2017
Trillium Cup: 2017

See also
 List of footballers with 100 or more caps

References

External links

possofutbol.com Profile
Concacaf Profile

1987 births
Living people
Sportspeople from Colón, Panama
Association football midfielders
Panamanian footballers
Panamanian expatriate footballers
Panama international footballers
FIFA Century Club
C.D. Árabe Unido players
Godoy Cruz Antonio Tomba footballers
ASC Oțelul Galați players
FC St. Pauli players
Toronto FC players
Universidad de Chile footballers
FC Dinamo București players
Maccabi Petah Tikva F.C. players
Hapoel Tel Aviv F.C. players
Liga Panameña de Fútbol players
Chilean Primera División players
Liga I players
2. Bundesliga players
Israeli Premier League players
Major League Soccer players
Expatriate footballers in Argentina
Expatriate footballers in Chile
Expatriate footballers in Romania
Expatriate footballers in Germany
Expatriate soccer players in Canada
Expatriate footballers in Israel
Panamanian expatriate sportspeople in Argentina
Panamanian expatriate sportspeople in Chile
Panamanian expatriate sportspeople in Germany
Panamanian expatriate sportspeople in Romania
Panamanian expatriate sportspeople in Canada
Panamanian expatriate sportspeople in Israel
2011 Copa Centroamericana players
2011 CONCACAF Gold Cup players
2014 Copa Centroamericana players
2015 CONCACAF Gold Cup players
Copa América Centenario players
2017 Copa Centroamericana players
2017 CONCACAF Gold Cup players
2018 FIFA World Cup players
2019 CONCACAF Gold Cup players
2021 CONCACAF Gold Cup players